Hen-allt Common is a Site of Special Scientific Interest in Brecknock, Powys, Wales. Its special features include unimproved grassland, Flat-sedge Blysmus compressus and Meadow saffron Colchicum autumnale.

See also
List of Sites of Special Scientific Interest in Brecknock

External links
British Geological Society description

Sites of Special Scientific Interest in Brecknock